Francis Fox is a member of the Senate of Canada.

Francis Fox may also refer to:

Francis Fox (divine) (1675–1738), English divine
Sir Francis Fox (civil engineer) (1844–1927), English civil engineer
Francis Hugh Fox (1863–1952), English rugby player
Francis John Fox (1857–1902), New Zealand soldier and farmer
Francis Lane Fox (1899–1989), British Army officer and Yorkshire landowner

See also
Frank Fox (disambiguation)
Frances Fox Piven (born 1932), Canadian professor